Frederick Nicholas Zihlman (October 2, 1879 – April 22, 1935) was an American congressman representing Maryland's 6th congressional district from 1917 to 1931.

Biography
Born in Carnegie, Allegheny County, Pennsylvania, USA, Zihlman moved to Maryland with his parents, who settled in Cumberland in 1882. He attended the public schools, and entered a glass factory in 1890 as an apprentice glass blower. He was later president of the local flint-glass workers' union from 1904 to 1909 and was a member of the national executive board in 1905 and 1906. He served as president of the Allegany Trades Council from 1904 to 1909, and as president of the Maryland State Federation of Labor in 1906 and 1907. He engaged in the real estate and insurance business in Cumberland in 1912.

Politics
Zihlman served as a member of the Maryland State Senate from 1909 to 1917, serving as Republican floor leader in 1914 and 1916.

He was an unsuccessful candidate for election in 1914 to the Sixty-fourth US Congress, but was elected two years later as a Republican to the Sixty-fifth and to the six succeeding Congresses, serving from March 4, 1917, to March 3, 1931. In Congress, Zihlman was chairman of the Committee on Expenditures in the Post Office Department (Sixty-sixth and Sixty-seventh Congresses). He was also a member of the Committee on the District of Columbia (Sixty-seventh Congress and Sixty-ninth through Seventy-first Congresses) and the Committee on Labor (Sixty-seventh and Sixty-eighth Congresses).

Zihlman was accused of corruption and bribery in 1929. When the inquiry produced no evidence, he was acquitted. He was an unsuccessful candidate for reelection in 1930 and again in 1934 to the Seventy-fourth Congress.

After his tenure in Congress, he resumed his former business pursuits in Cumberland, until his death there. He is interred in St. John's Cemetery in Forest Glen, Maryland.

References

1879 births
1935 deaths
20th-century American businesspeople
20th-century American politicians
American businesspeople in insurance
American real estate businesspeople
Businesspeople from Cumberland, Maryland
American trade union leaders
Republican Party Maryland state senators
People from Carnegie, Pennsylvania
Politicians from Cumberland, Maryland
Republican Party members of the United States House of Representatives from Maryland